Tropang Potchi is a Philippine television informative children's show broadcast by GMA Network. It premiered on December 19, 2009. The show concluded on February 14, 2015.

Set in a modern milieu, the program aims to promote traditional Filipino values through comic narrative stories and feature segments.

Overview
The show was first aired from December 19, 2009 to January 16, 2011 on Q. The program was a talent show for elementary school students hosted by six child actors together with a strawberry-colored mascot, Potchi. The show included educational segments where children are taught spelling, vocabulary, grammar, science, people, and nature, among other things. The game portion, on the other hand, features a giant game board that challenges the children's mental and physical abilities. Other regular segments in the show are "Video-OK!," where children send in videos of themselves or their friends and relatives; "Aprub!," a feature on people, events, and places that are remarkable and worthy of getting the Potchi "aprub" mark, "Dear Kapotchi," a portion where viewers can send feedback and even school activity announcements; and "Sabi ni Potchi," (lit. Potchi says) a series of short stories featuring Potchi the mascot, injecting humor, commentary and trivia.

It ran for 4 seasons until Columbia wanted to reformat the program into a weekly values-driven narrative show with informative feature segments. With the new direction, in 2011, Columbia and the network decided to transfer the program to GMA Network and officially aired on April 30 of the same year. The current format of the show makes use of animated sequences, experiments and activities to make the show more accessible and entertaining to a young audience, while discussing social issues with the youth such as bullying, internet addiction, gender sensitivity, environmentalism, value for education, and dealing with issues among family and friends.

Cast

Sabrina Man
Miggy Jimenez
Lianne Valentino
Isabel Frial
Nomer Limatog
Miggs Cuaderno
Kyle Danielle Ocampo
Ayla Mendero
Jessu Trinidad
Andrea Reyes
Ella Cruz
Julian Trono
Bianca Umali

Ratings
According to AGB Nielsen Philippines' Mega Manila household television ratings, the final episode of Tropang Potchi scored a 6.5% rating.

Accolades

References

External links
 

2009 Philippine television series debuts
2015 Philippine television series endings
Filipino-language television shows
GMA Network original programming
Q (TV network) original programming